The first summit meeting between the European Union (EU) and Brazil took place in Lisbon on 4 July 2007. At the summit, Brazil was granted special partnership status with the EU.

Leaders at the summit
  Portugal and  European Union
 Prime Minister of Portugal and President-in-office of the Council of the European Union José Sócrates
  Brazil
 President of Brazil Luiz Inácio Lula da Silva
  European Union
 President of the European Commission José Manuel Barroso

Participants at the dinner
  Portugal
 Prime Minister José Sócrates
  Portugal
 President Aníbal Cavaco Silva
  Brazil
 President Luiz Inácio Lula da Silva
  European Union
 President of the European Commission José Manuel Barroso
  France
 President Nicolas Sarkozy
  Spain
 Prime Minister José Luis Rodríguez Zapatero
  Italy
 Prime Minister Romano Prodi
  Slovenia
 Prime Minister Janez Janša

Location
This summit took place in Lisbon, at the Pavilhão Atlântico. The dinner was offered by the Portuguese President Aníbal Cavaco Silva, at Belém Cultural Center.

Discussions
The summit aimed to establish closer relations between the European Union and Brazil. Portugal formally invited its former colony, Brazil, to be a strategic partner of the EU, along with India, Russia and China, meaning that all the BRIC countries now had special partnership status.

Issues concerned with a proposed trade agreement between the EU and the Mercosur group of South American countries including Brazil were also discussed.

Associated with the summit, the oil and energy corporations Galp Energia of Portugal and Petrobras of Brazil signed an agreement on production of vegetable oils in Brazil.

See also
Brazil and the European Union

References

External links
 The official website of the Portuguese Presidency of the European Union

 
2007 in Portugal
2007 in Brazil
Diplomatic conferences in Portugal
21st-century diplomatic conferences
2007 in international relations
2000s in Lisbon
Events in Lisbon
Galp Energia

es:Relaciones entre Brasil y la Unión Europea
pt:Relações entre Brasil e União Europeia